The Opium Wars ( Yāpiàn zhànzhēng) were two conflicts waged between China and Western powers during the mid-19th century. The First Opium War was fought from 1839 to 1842 between China and the United Kingdom, and was triggered by the Chinese government's campaign to enforce its prohibition against opium trafficking by British merchants. The Second Opium War was waged by Britain and France against China from 1856 to 1860. In each war, the superior military advantages enjoyed by European forces led to several easy victories over the Chinese military, with the consequence that China was compelled to sign unequal treaties to grant favourable tariffs, trade concessions, reparations and territory to Western powers.

The two conflicts, along with the various treaties imposed during the "century of humiliation", weakened the Chinese government's authority and forced China to open specified treaty ports (including Shanghai) to Western merchants. In addition, China ceded sovereignty over Hong Kong to the British Empire, which maintained control over the region until 1997. During this period, the Chinese economy also contracted slightly as a result of the wars, though the Taiping Rebellion and Dungan Revolt had a much larger economic effect.

First Opium War

The First Opium War broke out in 1839 between China and Britain and was fought over trading rights (including the right of free trade) and Britain's diplomatic status among Chinese officials. In the eighteenth century, China enjoyed a trade surplus with Europe, trading porcelain, silk, and tea in exchange for silver. By the late 17th century, the British East India Company (EIC) expanded the cultivation of opium in the Bengal Presidency, selling it to private merchants who transported it to China and covertly sold it on to Chinese smugglers. By 1797, the EIC was selling 4,000 chests of opium (each weighing 77 kg) to private merchants per annum.

In earlier centuries, opium was utilised as a medicine with anesthetic qualities, but new Chinese practices of smoking opium recreationally increased demand tremendously and often led to smokers developing addictions. Successive Chinese emperors issued edicts making opium illegal in 1729, 1799, 1814, and 1831, but imports grew as smugglers and colluding officials in China sought profit. Some American merchants entered the trade by smuggling opium from Turkey into China, including Warren Delano Jr., the grandfather of twentieth-century President Franklin D. Roosevelt, and Francis Blackwell Forbes; in American historiography this is sometimes referred to as the Old China Trade. By 1833, the Chinese opium trade soared to 30,000 chests. British and American merchants sent opium to warehouses in the free-trade port of Canton, and sold it to Chinese smugglers.

In 1834, the EIC's monopoly on British trade with China ceased, and the opium trade burgeoned. Partly concerned with moral issues over the consumption of opium and partly with the outflow of silver, the Daoguang Emperor charged Governor General Lin Zexu with ending the trade. In 1839, Lin published in Canton an open letter to Queen Victoria requesting her cooperation in halting the opium trade. The letter never reached the Queen. It was later published in The Times as a direct appeal to the British public for their cooperation. An edict from the Daoguang Emperor followed on 18March, emphasising the serious penalties for opium smuggling that would now apply henceforth. Lin ordered the seizure of all opium in Canton, including that held by foreign governments and trading companies (called factories), and the companies prepared to hand over a token amount to placate him. Charles Elliot, Chief Superintendent of British Trade in China, arrived 3 days after the expiry of Lin's deadline, as Chinese troops enforced a shutdown and blockade of the factories. The standoff ended after Elliot paid for all the opium on credit from the British government (despite lacking official authority to make the purchase) and handed the 20,000 chests (1,300 metric tons) over to Lin, who had them destroyed at Humen. 

Elliott then wrote to London advising the use of military force to resolve the dispute with the Chinese government. A small skirmish occurred between British and Chinese warships in the Kowloon Estuary on 4 September 1839. After almost a year, the British government decided, in May 1840, to send a military expedition to impose reparations for the financial losses experienced by opium traders in Canton and to guarantee future security for the trade. On 21 June 1840, a British naval force arrived off Macao and moved to bombard the port of Dinghai. In the ensuing conflict, the Royal Navy used its superior ships and guns to inflict a series of decisive defeats on Chinese forces.

The war was concluded by the Treaty of Nanjing in 1842, the first of the Unequal treaties between China and Western powers. The treaty ceded the Hong Kong Island and surrounding smaller islands to Britain, and established five cities as treaty ports open to Western traders: Shanghai, Canton, Ningbo, Fuzhou, and Xiamen (Amoy). The treaty also stipulated that China would pay a twenty-one million dollar payment to Britain as reparations for the destroyed opium, with six million to be paid immediately, and the rest through specified installments thereafter. Another treaty the following year gave most favoured nation status to Britain and added provisions for British extraterritoriality. France secured the same concessions in treaties of 1843 and 1844.

Second Opium War

In 1853, northern China was convulsed by the Taiping Rebellion, which established its capital at Nanking. In spite of this, a new Imperial Commissioner, Ye Mingchen, was appointed at Canton, determined to stamp out the opium trade, which was still technically illegal. In October 1856, he seized the Arrow, a ship claiming British registration, and threw its crew into chains. Sir John Bowring, Governor of British Hong Kong, called up Rear Admiral Sir Michael Seymour's East Indies and China Station fleet, which, on 23 October, bombarded and captured the Pearl River forts on the approach to Canton and proceeded to bombard Canton itself, but had insufficient forces to take and hold the city. On 15 December, during a riot in Canton, European commercial properties were set on fire and Bowring appealed for military intervention. The execution of a French missionary inspired support from France.

Britain and France now sought greater concessions from China, including the legalisation of the opium trade, expanding of the transportation of coolies to European colonies, opening all of China to British and French citizens and exempting foreign imports from internal transit duties. The war resulted in the 1858 Treaty of Tientsin, in which the Chinese government agreed to pay war reparations for the expenses of the recent conflict, open a second group of ten ports to European commerce, legalise the opium trade, and grant foreign traders and missionaries rights to travel within China. After a second phase of fighting which included the sack of the Old Summer Palace and the occupation of the Forbidden City palace complex in Beijing, the treaty was confirmed by the Convention of Peking in 1860.

See also
 Destruction of opium at Humen
 History of opium in China

References

Further reading
  Beeching, Jack. The Chinese Opium Wars (Harvest Books, 1975)
 .
 Gelber, Harry G. Opium, Soldiers and Evangelicals: Britain's 1840–42 War with China, and its Aftermath. Palgrave Macmillan, 2004).
 Hanes, W. Travis and Frank Sanello. The Opium Wars: The Addiction of One Empire and the Corruption of Another (2014) 
 Kitson, Peter J. "The Last War of the Romantics: De Quincey, Macaulay, the First Chinese Opium War" Wordsworth Circle (2018) 49#3 online
 Lovell, Julia. The Opium War: Drugs, Dreams, and the Making of Modern China(2011). 
 Marchant, Leslie R. "The War of the Poppies," History Today (May 2002) Vol. 52 Issue 5, pp 42–49, online popular history
  556 pp. 
 Kenneth Pomeranz, "Blundering into War" (review of Stephen R. Platt, Imperial Twilight: The Opium War and the End of China's Last Golden Age, Vintage), The New York Review of Books, vol. LXVI, no. 10 (6 June 2019), pp. 38–41.
 Polachek, James M., The inner opium war (Harvard Univ Asia Center, 1992).
 
 Waley, Arthur, ed. The Opium War through Chinese eyes (1960).
 Wong, John Y. Deadly Dreams: Opium, Imperialism, and the Arrow War (1856–1860) in China. (Cambridge UP, 2002) 
 Yu, Miles Maochun. "Did China Have A Chance To Win The Opium War?" Military History in the News July 3, 2018

External links
 "The Opium Wars", BBC Radio 4 discussion with Yangwen Zheng, Lars Laamann, and Xun Zhou (In Our Time, 12 April 2007)